Elfi Schlegel (born 17 May 1964) is a sportscaster for NBC Sports and a former college and national champion gymnast from Canada.   She is generally regarded as a top 50 Canadian gymnast of all time, and maybe even the 3rd best of the late 1970s behind Monica Goermann and the late Sherry Hawco.

Early years 

Schlegel was born in Toronto, Ontario, to parents Peter and Vlasta Schlegel, immigrants from Switzerland.  Growing up in the Toronto suburb of Etobicoke, she started gymnastics at the age of 7.  She attended Silverthorn Collegiate Institute in Toronto, and graduated with her diploma after her grade twelve year—a year early in the (then) thirteen-year Ontario education system.

International career 

Schlegel established herself as one of the best gymnasts in Canadian history (at that point) when she won a gold medal in the all-around and team competitions in gymnastics at the 1978 Commonwealth Games in Edmonton, Alberta.  At the 1979 Pan American Games in San Juan, Puerto Rico, she won a bronze medal as the third-best gymnast in the games, two silver medals for the uneven bars and vault, and a gold medal as a member of the first-place Canadian team.  She also won a bronze medal in the vault at the 1980 World Cup in Toronto, the first-ever World Cup medal for a Canadian.

She was selected as a member of the Canadian national team for the 1980 Summer Olympics in Moscow, Russia, but was unable to participate when Canada joined the United States–led boycott of the Moscow Games in protest of the invasion of Afghanistan by the Soviet Union.    She attempted to make the Canadian Olympic teams in 1984 and 1988, but replaced by younger and more talented gymnasts with the increasing depth of Canadian gymnastics was unable to make it either time.

College career 

After graduation from high school, Schlegel wanted to continue to compete, but Canadian universities did not offer intercollegiate gymnastics competition or athletic scholarships.  She sought and received an athletic scholarship to attend the University of Florida in Gainesville, Florida, where she was a member of coach Ernestine Weaver's Florida Gators women's gymnastics team in National Collegiate Athletic Association (NCAA) competition from 1982 to 1986.  As a Gator gymnast, she was a four-time individual Southeastern Conference (SEC) champion–all-around (1983), twice in the balance beam (1983, 1986), and vault (1984).  The Gators qualified for the NCAA national championship tournament all four of Schlegel's years on the team, and finished third at the 1983 NCAA tournament.  She received six All-American honours.

Schlegel graduated from Florida with a bachelor's degree in telecommunications production in 1986, and was inducted into the University of Florida Athletic Hall of Fame as a "Gator Great" in 1997.

Broadcasting career 
She began her broadcasting career as a part-time gymnastics commentator for CTV, moved to CBC for the 1988 Summer Olympics in Seoul, Korea, and has been with NBC Sports as an Olympic broadcaster since 1992.  The 2012 Summer Olympics was her tenth Olympics as a broadcaster.  In 2000 and 2004, she served as analyst for both artistic and rhythmic gymnastics and trampoline reporter in Sydney and Athens.  She has served as a reporter for curling events in the 2002, 2006, and 2010 Winter Olympics.  She has also covered skiing and major Horse Racing events, including the Breeders Cup, for NBC Sports from 1993 to 1999.

Elfi was a NBC's gymnastics commentator along with Tim Daggett and Al Trautwig from 1992 to 2012.  NBC made the decision to replace Elfi after the 2012 Olympics with 2008 Olympic All Around Gold Medalist, Nastia Liukin. This decision was based on the fresh popularity of Liukin and the fact NBC was feeling pressure to have an All-American commentary panel.  Elfi now sometimes covers gymnastics commentary for Canadian television with Kyle Shewfelt.   She also frequently covered gymnastics for CBC Sports from 1989-1994.

Personal

Schlegel is married to Marc Dunn, a former Olympian who represented Canada in beach volleyball at the 1996 Summer Olympics.  They have three children and live in Toronto.

See also 

 Florida Gators
 List of University of Florida alumni
 List of University of Florida Athletic Hall of Fame members

References

Bibliography 
 Caraccioli, Jerry, & Tom Caraccioli, Boycott: Stolen Dreams of the 1980 Moscow Olympic Games, New Chapter Press, Washington, D.C. (2009).  .
 Schlegel, Elfi, & Claire Ross Dunn, The Gymnastics Book: The Young Performer's Guide to Gymnastics, Firefly Books Ltd., Richmond Hill, Ontario (2001).  .

External links 
 
 

1964 births
Living people
Canadian people of Swiss descent
American horse racing announcers
American sports announcers
American television reporters and correspondents
American women television journalists
Canadian female artistic gymnasts
Canadian horse racing announcers
Commonwealth Games medallists in gymnastics
Commonwealth Games gold medallists for Canada
Curling broadcasters
Florida Gators women's gymnasts
Gymnastics broadcasters
Gymnasts at the 1978 Commonwealth Games
Gymnasts at the 1979 Pan American Games
Gymnasts from Toronto
Olympic Games broadcasters
Pan American Games gold medalists for Canada
Pan American Games silver medalists for Canada
Pan American Games bronze medalists for Canada
Pan American Games medalists in gymnastics
Women sports announcers
Medalists at the 1979 Pan American Games
University of Florida College of Journalism and Communications alumni
Medallists at the 1978 Commonwealth Games